Emamzadeh Monir (also Romanized as Emāmzādeh Monīr and Emāmzādehmonīr) is a village in Mahur Rural District, Mahvarmilani District, Mamasani County, Fars Province, Iran. At the 2006 census, its population was 13, in 4 families.

References 

Populated places in Mamasani County